Wrath of the Math is the second album by the hip hop artist Jeru the Damaja. The album spawned the 2 singles "Ya Playin' Yaself" and "Me or the Papes". The album peaked at number 3 on the US Top R&B/Hip Hop Albums, and number 35 on the US Billboard 200.

Album information 
The album was completely produced by DJ Premier and continues the themes of Afrocentricity, preserving hip-hop culture, and more about the harms of materialism that were discussed on The Sun Rises in the East.

In its liner notes, it even says, "This album was created to SAVE hip-hop and the minds of the people who listen to it." One significant track that intends to uphold Jeru's vision of hip hop is "One Day", where he tells a story of Puff Daddy, Foxy Brown and Bad Boy Records kidnapping somebody named Hip-Hop. The Notorious B.I.G. took offense to the song, as he was signed to Bad Boy Records, and was closely connected with Puff Daddy and Foxy Brown. Biggie retaliated by throwing subtle jabs at Jeru in the song "Kick in the Door" (which was aimed at other rap artists as well). The track "Me or the Papes" contains aim for Puff Daddy, Jeru stating, "My name ain't Puff, I ain't got loot to waste", to which Puff Daddy did not respond.

It contains many tracks that are sequels to songs on Jeru's first album such as "Revenge of the Prophet (Part 5)", "Me or the Papes" and "Physical Stamina", featuring Afu-Ra, the one guest emcee, as he was on Jeru's first album.

Reception 

The album was well-received, but was not as critically acclaimed as his first album. John Bush of Allmusic was one of the few critics who felt that it was just as strong as Jeru's first album.

Entertainment Weekly: "Combined with DJ Premier's head-bobbing minimalist funk, Jeru tells it like it is like no other."

Vibe: "Armed with a prophet's sense of social responsibility, Webster's vocab, and the best beats in the business.... Jeru's at his best...when he fights playa-ism with its most potent weapon: sharply visual, action-packed narrative."

The Source: 3 Mics: Good—"Returning with an unabashed intolerance for the artistic moves of some well-known rap figures...Jeru the Damaja proves that his musical compositions are too mentally stimulating to be ignored."

Melody Maker: Ranked #43 on Melody Maker's 1996 list of Albums of the Year.

Track listing 
All songs produced by DJ Premier

Album singles

Album chart positions

Singles chart positions

References 

1996 albums
Jeru the Damaja albums
Albums produced by DJ Premier
FFRR Records albums